United Nations General Assembly Resolution 1541 of 15 December 1960, titled "Principles which should guide members in determining whether or not an obligation exists to transmit the information called for under Article 73e of the Charter" was a resolution of the United Nations General Assembly during its fifteenth session with annexes of 12 principles, that affirmed that to ensure decolonisation, complete compliance with the principle of self-determination is required.

See also 
 United Nations General Assembly Resolution 1514 (XV) A Declaration on the Granting of Independence to Colonial Countries and Peoples
 Decolonization
 Self-determination

External links 

 United Nations General Assembly Resolution A/RES/1541(XV): Principles which should guide members in determining whether or nor an obligation exists to transmit the information called for under Article 73e of the Charter.
 United Nations Trusteeship Agreements or were listed by the General Assembly as Non-Self-Governing
 

1541
1960 in law
1960 in the United Nations
December 1960 events
Decolonization